Women's 10 metre air pistol made its first Olympic appearance at the 1988 Summer Olympics. It was a high-class competition, where Nino Salukvadze, who had won the 25 metre pistol competition two days earlier, set a new world record in the qualification round, with 390 of 400 points. Jasna Šekarić was still able to enter the final only one point behind, and won it to become the first Olympic air pistol champion. Lieselotte Breker, third in the qualification round with 386, started out the final with a 0.0 and was then never in contention for the medals; Marina Dobrantcheva won the bronze medal.

Qualification round

OR Olympic record – Q Qualified for final – WR World record

Final

OR Olympic record – WR World record

References

Sources

Shooting at the 1988 Summer Olympics
Olymp
Shoo